Whaley Bridge is a town and civil parish in the High Peak district of Derbyshire, England. It had a population of 6,455 at the 2011 census, including Furness Vale, Horwich End, Bridgemont, Fernilee, Stoneheads and Taxal.

History
There is evidence of prehistoric activity in the area, including early Bronze Age standing stones, burial sites and the remains of a stone circle. A bronze-age axe head was discovered in 2005. There has long been speculation that the 'Roosdyche', a complex of banks and ditches on the eastern side of the town, is of prehistoric human origin, but investigations in 1962 concluded that it was formed by glacial meltwater.

The name of Weyley or Weylegh appears in many 13th-century documents and is derived from the Anglo Saxon weg lēah, meaning 'a clearing by the road'. In 1351, the lands of Weyley and Yeardsley were granted to William Joddrell for his faithful service to Edward, the Black Prince. In the 14th century, it housed the residence of William Jauderell and his descendants; their name also spelt 'Jodrell', who gave their name to the modern Jodrell Bank Observatory in Cheshire. The Jodrells continued to call their lands Yeardsley Whaley for centuries and, when the first local government board was formed in 1863 and the area became an urban district, the town adopted its popular name of Whaley Bridge; the town has been called so ever since. Parish records from the 1820s refer to Horridge rather than Horwich.

The River Goyt formed the historical boundary between Derbyshire and Cheshire. The present town of Whaley Bridge was divided into smaller towns in both counties. Historical records show that, in 1316, on the Cheshire side there were Taxal, Yeardsley and Whaley; the last two were combined into one district of Yeardsley-cum-Whaley. The Derbyshire side consisted only of Fernilee, which included the villages of Shallcross and Horwich. This side was in the parish of Hope and was part of the Forest of High Peak, while the Cheshire side was part of the Forest of Macclesfield. From 1796, Taxal and Yeardsley were effectively joined in that the Jodrell family was the main landowner in both towns, although the administration of these remained separate until 1936.

Until the late 19th century, the population of the area grew slowly. For example, in the diocesan census in 1563, Taxal is recorded as having 26 households and, by the mid-18th century, Taxal and Yeardsley together only reached 55 households. In 1791, land at Whaley Bridge was advertised for sale; the owner believed that its waterpower would be useful in the textile industry, but the two townships remained very small and only had a population of 853 between them by 1841. Up to this time, agriculture and coalmining had been the main occupations.

The town expanded greatly in the Industrial Revolution and the population almost trebled to 2,322. Although there had been coal mines from earlier times, cotton mills had become the dominant industry by 1871. Coal mining took place in the area from its very early days because of a large geographical fault which traverses the Whaley Bridge basin from east to west; this results in the coal outcropping in various places. Documentary evidence of 1587 indicates a well-established coal industry in the Towneshepp of Weley, known today as Whaley Bridge. Today, there is less intensive agriculture labour and no coal mining in the area.

Today
Whaley Bridge continues to expand as new housing is built, but retains the character of a small town. As the self-styled Gateway to the Goyt, it attracts tourists, mainly walkers, but has not become dominated by the tourist industry, unlike some other local towns and villages. The Peak District Boundary Walk runs through the village.

The town has been twinned with Tymbark, Poland, since June 1994.

Cromford and High Peak Railway
The Cromford and High Peak Railway was granted Parliamentary consent in 1825. It was fully opened for passenger and goods traffic on 6 July 1831. The railway linked the wharf at the head of the Whaley Bridge Branch of the Peak Forest Canal to the Cromford Canal at Cromford Wharf. It had seven inclined planes, the first being situated within the town of Whaley Bridge itself. Unlike the other six inclined planes, which were operated by stationary steam engines, this one was operated by a horse-driven gin, which remained operational until 9 April 1952. This plane was much shorter than the others, being only 180 yards (165 m) long and rising at 1:13.5. Approach to the top of the plane was under a very low bridge and, because of this, waggons had to be hauled to and from the top of the plane by horses.
 
Horses also worked the bottom section of the line and the tracks ran onto a wharf and into two mills. Another notable feature on the bottom section is an iron bridge that carries the line across the River Goyt.

Peak Forest Canal

The Peak Forest Canal and basin were built in the 1790s and opened on 1 May 1800. An important Grade 2 listed building at the head of the Peak Forest Canal was the Transhipment Warehouse, built in 1801 and extended after the arrival of the railway in 1832. In this building, goods and minerals were transferred to and from the many working canal boats servicing local industry. The building straddles the head of the canal which is fed by the Combs and Toddbrook reservoirs to the south. The canal splits just outside Whaley Bridge, turning east to end at Buxworth basin and turning west to Marple, the Cheshire Ring and Manchester.

1872 Whaley Bridge Flood
On 19 June 1872, a massive flood became one of the worst in English history. The town received as much as 2 inches of rain in 24 hours.

2019 evacuation

On 1 August 2019, part of the town was evacuated on the orders of Derbyshire Police after flooding caused damage to the dam at Toddbrook Reservoir. Parts of nearby Furness Vale and New Mills were also evacuated. The Royal Air Force and all high-volume pumping units from various fire services were drafted in, along with Chinook helicopters bringing in aggregate and providing support. The Environment Agency and Derbyshire Fire Brigade reported that the dam was at "real risk of collapse", with 1,500 residents being evacuated from the town. After the first day, the water level of the dam had been reduced by half a metre, but authorities said this would need to fall several metres before it could be considered safe.

Governance

Local government

Whaley Bridge is a civil parish with the status of a town. At the lowest level of local government is Whaley Bridge Town Council, consisting of 12 councillors. Three councillors are elected for each of the four wards of Fernilee, Furness Vale, Taxal and Yeardsley.

The next tier of local government is High Peak Borough Council. Whaley Bridge constitutes one of the borough's 28 wards. It returns 3 of the 43 borough councillors. At the last council elections in May 2015, one Conservative Party, one Liberal Democrat and one independent councillor were elected.

The top tier of local administration is the 64-member Derbyshire County Council. The town is included in the electoral division of Whaley Bridge and Blackbrook, electing one county councillor. In the 2021 local elections, the town's former Labour MP Ruth George was re-elected to Derbyshire County Council, defeating former Conservative MP Edwina Currie Jones.

Civic history
The township of Yeardsley-cum-Whaley, Cheshire, was part of the ancient parish of Taxal. The township adopted the Local Government Act 1858 and formed a local board to govern the town. Under the Local Government Act 1894 this became Yeardsley-cum-Whaley Urban District. On the Derbyshire side of the Goyt, the parish of Fernilee was included in Chapel en le Frith Rural District. In 1936 a county review order merged the urban district with the built-up part of Fernilee to form Whaley Bridge Urban District, with the new district placed in Derbyshire.

In 1974 the Local Government Act 1972 came into force, abolishing all urban and rural districts in England and Wales, and replacing them with non-metropolitan districts. Whaley Bridge became part of the district of High Peak, with a successor parish formed for the area of the urban district. The parish council resolved that Whaley Bridge should have the status of a town.

Whaley Bridge is surrounded by, but not part of, the Peak District National Park.

Education
The town has two primary schools: Whaley Bridge Primary School and Taxal & Fernilee Church of England Primary School. For secondary education, children must travel further afield, typically to Chapel-en-le-Frith, New Mills, Hope Valley, Buxton, Macclesfield or Stockport. Schools in these areas include Chapel-en-le-Frith High School, New Mills School, Hope Valley College, King's School and Stockport Grammar School.

Transport

Whaley Bridge railway station is on the Buxton line between Manchester Piccadilly, Stockport and Buxton. There is a generally hourly service in each direction, operated by Northern Trains.

The town is served by bus services operated primarily by High Peak. This includes the 199 skyline service, which runs every 30 minutes between Buxton, Stockport and Manchester Airport. Other services in the town run to Glossop, Hayfield, Macclesfield and New Mills.

Religious sites

The Church of England parish of Whaley Bridge has two churches. St James, Taxal, stands on a site a mile from the town centre and was established in the 12th century. Parts of the fabric of the bell tower date back to that time, although the tower was rebuilt in the late 16th or early 17th century. The rest of the church building was fully rebuilt in 1825 and restored in 1889 when the chancel was also enlarged. However, many internal elements of the earlier church were retained, including the 17th-century communion rail and panelling, 18th-century monuments and a royal coat of arms from the reign of Queen Anne. It is a Grade II* listed building. Holy Trinity Church, Fernilee, was established near the town centre in 1905. Parts of the town are included in the Cheshire parish of St John, Disley, and are served by the Church of St John the Divine, Furness Vale.

The Roman Catholic Church of the Sacred Heart, Whaley Lane, serves the parish of Whaley Bridge and Disley.

The United Reformed Church and Methodists formed a local ecumenical partnership, the "Whaley Bridge Uniting Partnership" in 1983, subsequently joined by the Baptists. The partnership has three places of worship: Whaley Bridge Uniting Church, Fernilee Methodist Church and Kettleshulme Chapel.

The Good News Church is an evangelical church based in the Gospel Hall, Old Road.

Whaley Hall is a large detached Victorian house near Toddbrook Reservoir. Since 1979 it has been a retreat house and conference centre run by the Community of the King of Love, an ecumenical community of men and women. The painting Magistrate of Brussels, by Anthony van Dyck, hung there, unrecognised, during the first decade of the 21st century.

Festivals and traditions

Whaley Bridge has an annual carnival month in June. This launches on the second weekend of the month with 'Whaley Water Weekend', commonly known as W3. Launched in 2000, W3 started out as a small community event on the canal basin. It was relaunched in 2010 as a music and arts festival, building on its waterways core. The last event saw several thousand visitors, with record numbers taking advantage of free short canal boat rides and a longer heritage trip to Bugsworth Basin. In the evening crowds watched free live music on the outdoor stage. 2012 saw W3 enter into a partnership with the Canal & River Trust where they adopted the canal basin and the Peak Forest canal to the Bugsworth Arm.

The weekend of W3 is followed by the Well Dressing Weekend, a traditional Derbyshire event in which the local well is decorated with large collages of cones, flower petals, etc. Carnival month ends with the Rose Queen Carnival, started over a hundred years ago, where groups of local young people from the town, Rose Queen royalty from other villages and invited bands process through the main streets in their finery and on decorated floats culminating in events, stalls and entertainment held at Whaley Bridge Bowling Club. In 2009 a fell race, known as the Whaley Waltz, was added to the Rose Queen programme, and it annually attracts over 180 runners. Organised by Goyt Valley Striders, the race starts in the centre of the village and climbs 900 ft to Windgather Rocks and finishes after crossing the River Goyt on Forge Road. Following the carnival is the Rose Queen Pet Show, where locals bring their pets to compete in different classes.

November 2012 saw the relaunch of Whaley Bridge's firework event, with a new team of volunteers after the Round Table felt they were unable to continue. This also incorporated the town's first lantern parade.

The final event of the year is the switching on of the Christmas tree lights outside the Jodrell Arms Hotel, close to Whaley Bridge railway station. This is usually done by the chair of the Town Council and is accompanied by seasonable music from members of Whaley Bridge Brass Band. Father Christmas traditionally arrives at the Transshipment Warehouse on the Whaley Wharf of the Peak Forest Canal on a canal boat and processes to the Mechanics' Institute accompanied by his helpers. Businesses make their contribution to the town's Christmas decorations by way of small trees above their shops. The Town Council erects two large trees each year, the second being by the Soldier Dick public house at Furness Vale.

Notable residents 

Abraham Bennet, scientist, was baptised in Taxal.
Jack Bond, Lancashire and Nottinghamshire cricketer, was landlord of the Jodrell Arms.
Edwina Currie, politician and television personality, currently resides in Whaley Bridge. 
Jon Dasilva, British DJ and record producer.
Betty Driver MBE, actress and author, most famous for her role as Betty Williams on the British soap Coronation Street, was once the landlady of Whaley Bridge's Cock Inn.
Ruth George, politician.
Michael Heathcote, Groom of the Pantry and Yeoman of the Mouth (food taster) to King George III.
Brian Jackson, cricketer who played for Derbyshire CCC, still lives in the town and is Chairman of the local volunteer centre.
Bill Jones, Liverpool and England footballer and Military Medal winner, was born in Whaley Bridge in 1921.
Jennifer Pinches, British artistic gymnast, lives in Whaley Bridge.

Literary references
Whaley Bridge features in the novel The Manchester Man (1876) by Isabella Banks. The fictional Coronation Street character Minnie Caldwell retired to become a housekeeper in Whaley Bridge in 1976. In the travel section of The Sunday Telegraph, Tony Robinson writes of the Manchester to Derby journey "It is not a trip to do all in one go; stop off at the dramatic little town of Whaley Bridge and have a stroll around the historic Peak Forest Canal Basin".

See also
Listed buildings in Whaley Bridge

References

External links

 
 Whaley Bridge History Website
 Whaley Bridge Photographs Website

 
Towns in Derbyshire
Towns and villages of the Peak District
Civil parishes in Derbyshire
High Peak, Derbyshire